Simon Dvoršak (born 16 March 1974) is a retired Slovenian football midfielder.

References

External links
Simon Dvoršak at NZS 
Simon Dvoršak at ÖFB 

1974 births
Living people
Slovenian footballers
Association football midfielders
NK Maribor players
NK Korotan Prevalje players
NK Mura players
NK Beltinci players
NK Dravograd players
ND Gorica players
TSV Hartberg players
Wolfsberger AC players
Slovenian expatriate footballers
Expatriate footballers in Austria
Slovenian expatriate sportspeople in Austria
Slovenian PrvaLiga players
Austrian Regionalliga players
Slovenian football managers
Slovenian expatriate football managers
Expatriate football managers in Austria
NK Rudar Velenje managers